Renwick USD 267 is a public unified school district headquartered in Andale, Kansas, United States.  The district includes the communities of Andale, Colwich, Garden Plain, north Goddard, St. Marks, and nearby rural areas.

Schools
The school district operates the following schools:

 High Schools
 Andale High School (9-12) at 700 W. Rush Ave. in Andale.
 Garden Plain High School (9-12) at 720 N. Sedgwick St. in Garden Plain.

 Elmentary / Middle Schools
 Andale Elementary School, (K-8) at 500 W. Rush Ave. in Andale.
 Colwich Elementary School (PreK-8) at 401 S. Marian St. in Colwich.
 Garden Plain Elementary School (PreK-8) at 700 N. Section Line Rd. in Garden Plain.
 St. Marks School (K-8) at 19001 W. 29th St. N. in St. Marks.

See also
 List of high schools in Kansas
 List of unified school districts in Kansas
 Kansas State Department of Education
 Kansas State High School Activities Association

References

External links
 

School districts in Kansas
Education in Sedgwick County, Kansas